Chapelnoye is a rural locality (a selo) in Volokonovsky District, Belgorod Oblast, Russia. The population was 305 as of 2010. There are 4 streets.

Geography 
Chapelnoye is located 17 km northwest of Volokonovka (the district's administrative centre) by road. Nina is the nearest rural locality.

References 

Rural localities in Volokonovsky District